Rev. Juuso Niilonga Shikongo (born in 1917 in Iihongo, Onyaanya Constituency) was a Namibian teacher, priest, activist, and notable public servant, he is well-known for having risked his life on several occasions for the welfare of his community and the Independence of Namibia.

Rev. Juuso Shikongo Secondary School was established and named in his honour.

References

1917 births
1991 deaths
People from Oshikoto Region
Ovambo people
History of Namibia
South West African anti-apartheid activists
Namibian priests